Gulistan underpass is a pedestrian underpass in Dhaka. It is currently the second largest underpass in Bangladesh after the launch of Sursoptok underpass. Located in Gulistan, this underpass has been serving the people since 1997. Completed at Taka 34.3 million, this underpass has a market for selling products.

A variety of electronic products are sold in this underground market with 104 shops. Due to various problems of the underpass, People are not seen using this underpass too much. This underpass has access to multiple entry and exitways. It closes at eight o'clock at night.

References
 

Subway (underpass)
Dhaka
Buildings and structures in Dhaka
1997 establishments in Bangladesh
Tunnels in Bangladesh